Ryszard Wcisło "Chytry Jastrząb" ("Sly Hawk")  (April 8, 1933 – October 24, 2015) was a Polish scout leader who worked in the Krakow branch of  Polish Scouting and Guiding Association , KIHAM (:pl:Krąg Instruktorów Harcerskich im. Andrzeja Małkowskiego), ZHP-1918 (:pl:Związek Harcerstwa Polskiego rok założenia 1918), and lately in Scouting Association of the Republic.

Awards
2015: Commander's Cross of the Order of Polonia Restituta (posthumously)
2008: Officer's Cross of the Order of Polonia Restituta

References

1933 births
2015 deaths
Polish Scouts and Guides
Commanders of the Order of Polonia Restituta